David S. Slepian (June 30, 1923 – November 29, 2007) was an American mathematician. He is best known for his work with algebraic coding theory, probability theory, and distributed source coding. He was colleagues with Claude Shannon and Richard Hamming at Bell Labs.

Life and work

Born in Pittsburgh, Pennsylvania, he gained a B.Sc. at University of Michigan before joining the US Army in World War II, 
as a sonic deception officer in the Ghost army.
He received his Ph.D. from Harvard University in 1949, writing his dissertation in physics. After post-doctoral work at the 
University of Cambridge and University of Sorbonne, he worked at the Mathematics Research Center at Bell Telephone Laboratories, where he pioneered work in algebraic coding theory on group codes, first published in the paper A Class of Binary Signaling Alphabets.  Here, he also worked along with other information theory giants such as Claude Shannon and Richard Hamming. He also proved the possibility of singular detection, a perhaps unintuitive result. He is also known for
Slepian's lemma in probability theory (1962), and for discovering a fundamental result in
distributed source coding called Slepian–Wolf coding with Jack Keil Wolf (1973).

He later joined the University of Hawaii. His father was Joseph Slepian, also a scientist. His wife is the noted children's author Jan Slepian.

Slepians

Slepian's joint work with H.J. Landau and H.O. Pollak on discrete prolate spheroidal wave functions and sequences (DPSWF, DPSS) eventually led to the naming of the sequences as "Slepians". The naming suggestion was provided by Bob Parker of Scripp's Institute of Oceanography, who suggested that "discrete prolate spheroidal sequences" was a "mouthful".

This work was fundamental to the development of the multitaper, where the discrete form are used as an integral component.

Awards
IEEE Fellow
Fellow of  Institute of Mathematical Statistics
Claude E. Shannon Award from the IEEE Information Theory Group 1974, and due to this also the Shannon Lecturer 1974.
National Academy of Engineering elected member 1976
National Academy of Sciences elected member 1977
IEEE Alexander Graham Bell Medal 1981
IEEE Centennial Medal 1984
Society for Industrial and Applied Mathematics’s John von Neumann lecture award 1982
American Academy of Arts and Sciences elected member

References

20th-century American mathematicians
21st-century American mathematicians
Members of the United States National Academy of Sciences
Fellow Members of the IEEE
University of Michigan alumni
Harvard University alumni
University of Paris alumni
University of Hawaiʻi faculty
1923 births
2007 deaths
American information theorists
Scientists at Bell Labs
Scientists from Pittsburgh
IEEE Centennial Medal laureates
United States Army personnel of World War II
United States Army officers
American expatriates in France